The Women's Slalom in the 2020 Alpine Skiing World Cup involved 6 events, although there were 9 originally scheduled. 

Defending champion Mikaela Shiffrin from the United States was leading the discipline standings by 80 points after 5 events when her father Jeff suffered what proved to be a fatal head injury at the start of February, and Shiffrin immediately left the tour to return home to Colorado, which eventually caused her to miss the remainder of the season. Slovakian skier Petra Vlhová won the next event in Kranjska Gora, Slovenia, to move 20 points ahead of Shiffrin with three events remaining. 

But all of the final three events were cancelled. First, the slalom scheduled for Ofterschwang, Germany was canceled due to lack of snow and a bad forecast.  Then the finals, scheduled for Saturday, 21 March in Cortina d'Ampezzo, Italy, were cancelled due to the COVID-19 pandemic. And finally, the one remaining slalom, scheduled in Åre, Sweden, for which Shiffrin had planned to return, was canceled due to COVID infections being detected among the skiers.    Thus, the current leader in each discipline -- in this case, Vlhová -- automatically became the season winner of the crystal globe for that discipline.

Vlhová thus won the discipline title for the first time.

Standings

DNF1 = Did Not Finish run 1
DNQ = Did Not Qualify for run 2
DNF2 = Did Not Finish run 2
DSQ2 = Disqualified run 2
DNS = Did Not Start

See also
 2020 Alpine Skiing World Cup – Women's summary rankings
 2020 Alpine Skiing World Cup – Women's Overall
 2020 Alpine Skiing World Cup – Women's Downhill
 2020 Alpine Skiing World Cup – Women's Super-G
 2020 Alpine Skiing World Cup – Women's Giant Slalom
 2020 Alpine Skiing World Cup – Women's Combined
 2020 Alpine Skiing World Cup – Women's Parallel
 World Cup scoring system

References

External links
 Alpine Skiing at FIS website

Women's Slalom
FIS Alpine Ski World Cup slalom women's discipline titles